Dead Man's Land is a 2013 novel by Robert Ryan, based in World War I. It involves Sherlock Holmes' sidekick, Dr. Watson (created by Arthur Conan Doyle). It was written under license from the Sir Arthur Conan Doyle literary Estate.

Critical reception
Barry Forshaw listed it in his 'Books of the year 2013: Crime'. The Daily Express gave it 5/5, saying "this is a genuinely fascinating and finely researched piece of war fiction."

References

Historical mystery novels
2013 British novels
British mystery novels
Novels set during World War I
Simon & Schuster books